Carmen Miguelina Polanco Isais (born 19 May 1993) is a Dominican footballer who plays as a defender. She has been a member of the Dominican Republic women's national team.

Early life
Polanco hails from Valverde Province.

International career
Polanco represented the Dominican Republic at the 2010 CONCACAF Women's U-17 Championship qualifying stage and the 2012 CONCACAF Women's U-20 Championship qualifying. At senior level, she capped during the 2012 CONCACAF Women's Olympic Qualifying Tournament (and its qualifying) and the 2014 Central American and Caribbean Games.

References 

1993 births
Living people
Women's association football defenders
Dominican Republic women's footballers
People from Valverde Province
Dominican Republic women's international footballers
Competitors at the 2014 Central American and Caribbean Games